Gulosibacter is a Gram-positive, strictly aerobic, non-spore-forming and non-motile genus of bacteria from the family Microbacteriaceae.

References

Further reading 
 

Microbacteriaceae
Bacteria genera